Harold Joseph Dimmerling (September 23, 1914 – December 13, 1987) was an American prelate of the Roman Catholic Church. He served as bishop of the Diocese of Rapid City in South Dakota from 1969 until his death in 1987.

In 2018, the Diocese of Saint Paul announced that it had credible accusations of sexual abuse of a minor against Dimmerling.

Biography 
Joseph Dimmerling was born on September 23, 1914 in Braddock, Pennsylvania.  He was ordained to the priesthood for the  Diocese of Saint Cloud on May 2, 1940.  After his ordination, Dimmerling served in pastoral assignments in St. Cloud, Breckenridge, Brushvale, Glenwood, Villard, and Little Falls,  all in Minnesota.  He also served at the seminary at Collegeville, Minnesota. 

On September 11, 1969, Pope Paul VI appointed Dimmerling as bishop of the Diocese of Rapid City.  He was ordained bishop by Bishop George Speltz on October 30, 1969.  Dimmerling established a permanent diaconate program and a lay ministry program and ordained the first Native American deacon in the country.

Dimmerling started offices in the diocese for rural life, stewardship and social concerns.  He set up a ministry for people who were separated or divorced, and for widows.  He also established the West River Catholic newspaper.

Joseph Dimmerling died on December 13, 1987. In November 2018, the Diocese of Saint Cloud announced that it had credible accusations of sexual abuse of a minor against Dimmerling from his tenure as a priest in the diocese.

References

External links
Holy Rosary Mission – Red Cloud Indian School Digital Image Collection at Marquette University; Keyword: Dimmerling.

1914 births
1987 deaths
People from Braddock, Pennsylvania
Roman Catholic bishops of Rapid City
Roman Catholic Diocese of Saint Cloud
20th-century Roman Catholic bishops in the United States